Oleg Nikolayevich Trubachyov (also transliterated as Trubachev or Trubačev, ; 23 October 1930, in Stalingrad – 9 March 2002, in Moscow) was a Soviet and Russian linguist. A researcher of the etymology of Slavic languages and Slavic onomastics, specialist in historical linguistics and lexicographer. He was a Doctor of Sciences in Philological Sciences, an academician of the Russian Academy of Sciences and served as the editor-in-chief of the Etimologiya yearbook. His works are on the etymology of Slavic languages and on East Slavic onomastics.

He graduated from Dnipropetrovsk University in 1952. He became deputy director of the Russian Language Institute in 1966 and served as the head of the institute's sector on etymology and onomastics.

Works

Selected publications (all in Russian)
Oleg Trubachev [translation with substantial additions to each entry] Vasmer M.: Etimologicheskii slovar russkogo yazyka, 1st edition 1964–1973; 3rd edition 1996 Etymological Dictionary of the Russian language - online
Oleg Trubachev [editor-in-chief] Etimologicheskii slovar slavianskikh yazykov, since 1974, Volume 31 appeared in 2005 Etymological Dictionary of Slavic languages
Oleg Trubachev, Etnogenez i kultura drevneyshikh Slavian: lingvistichesskiye issledovaniya, 1991 [Ethnogenesis and culture of the oldest Slavs: linguistic studies]
Oleg Trubachev, V poiskakh edinstva: vzglyad filologa na problemu istokov Rusi (Moscow: Nauka, 1997)
Oleg Trubachev, Indoarica v Severnom Prichernomorye (Moscow: Nauka, 1999).

All major publications (in Russian)
 К этимологии слова  // Крат. сообщ. Ин-та славяноведния. — 1955. — No. 15. — с. 48–55.
 Принципы построения этимологических словарей славянских языков // ВЯ. — 1957. — No. 5. — С. 58–72.
 Этимологический словарь славянских языков Г. А. Ильинского // ВЯ. — 1957. — No. 6. — С. 91–96.
 Фасмер Макс // БСЭ. — 2-е изд. — 1958. — Т. 51. — С. 301. — Библиогр.: 5 назв. — Без подписи.
 Следы язычества в славянской лексике: (1. Trizna; 2. Pe ti; 3. Kobь) // Slav. rev. — 1958. — L. 11, No. 3/4. — S. 219–231. — Рез.: словен.
 Рец.: Черных П. Я. Очерк русской исторической лексикологии: Древнерус. период. М., 1956. 243 с. // Кратк. сообщ. Ин-та славяноведения. — 1958. — No. 25. — С. 89–106.
 История славянских терминов родства и некоторых древнейших терминов общественного строя. — М.: Изд-во АН СССР, 1959. — 212 с. — Библиогр.: С. 202–211.
 Происхождение названий домашних животных в славянских языках: (Этимол. исслед.). — М.: Изд-во АН СССР, 1960. — 115 с.
 Еще раз об этимологии слова росомаха // Крат. сообщ. Ин-та славяноведения. — 1960. — No. 28. — С. 74.
 Об этимологическом словаре русского языка: [Фасмер М. Русский этимологический словарь] // ВЯ. — 1960. — No. 3. — С. 60–69.
 Из истории названий каш в славянских языках // Slavia. — 1960. — Roe . 29, se? . 1. — S. 1-30.
 Несколько русских этимологий: (Бардадым, будоражить, норка, околоток, харя, худощавый, шушун) // Этимологические исследования по русскому языку. — М., 1961. — Вып. 3. — С. 41–51.
 О племенном названии уличи // Вопр. слав. языкознания. — 1961. — Вып. 5. — С. 186—190: рис.
 Рец.: Об одном опыте популяризации этимологии: [Шанский Н. М., Иванов В. В., Шанская Т. В. Краткий этимологический словарь русского языка: Пособие для учителя. М., 1961. 404 с.] // ВЯ. — 1961. — No. 5. — С. 129–135.
 Славянские этимологии 29-39 // Этимологические исследования по русскому языку. — М., 1962. — Вып. 2. — С. 26–43.
 Рец.: Вахрос И. С. Наименования обуви в русском языке. 1. Древнейшие наименования — до Петровской эпохи. Хельсинки, 1959. 271 с. // Крат. сообщ. Ин-та славяноведения. — 1962. — No. 35. — С. 99–101.
 Этимологический словарь славянских языков: (Праслав. лекс. фонд): Проспект. Проб. ст. — М.: Изд-во АН СССР, 1963. — 94 с.: карт. (подписано к печати 11 апреля 1963 г.)
 «Молчать» и «таять». О необходимости семасиологического словаря нового типа // Проблемы индоевропейского языкознания: Этюды по сравн.-ист. грамматике индоевр. яз. — М., 1964. — С. 100–105.
 Славянские этимологии 40. Слав. *gotovъ // Prace filol. — 1964. — T. 28. — S. 153–156.
 Пер.: Фасмер М. Этимологический словарь русского языка: Пер. с нем. — М.: Прогресс, 1964. — Т. 1. — 562 с. — (С доп.).
 Ремесленная терминология в славянских языках: (Этимология и опыт групповой реконструкции): Автореф. дисс. на соиск. учен. степ. д-ра филол. наук. — М.: [Ин-т рус. яз. АН СССР], 1965. — 24 с.
 Этимологические мелочи // Этимология: Принципы реконструкции и методика исслед. — М., 1965. — С. 131–134.
 Рец.: Из истории слов и словарей: Очерки по лексикологии и лексикографии. Л., 1963. 184 с. // Там же. — С. 355.
 Рец.: Мартынов В. В. Славяно-германское лексическое взаимодействие древнейшей поры: (К пробл. прародины славян). Минск, 1963. 250 с. // Там же. — С. 357–359.
 Ремесленная терминология в славянских языках (Этимология и опыт групповой реконструкции). — М.: Наука, 1966. — 416 с.
 Работа над этимологическим словарем славянских языков и проблема своеобразия славянского словарного состава // Международный симпозиум. Проблемы славянских этимологических исследований в связи с общей проблематикой современной этимологии (24-31 января 1967). Программа. Тез. докл.. — М., 1966. — С. 3; 8–9.
 Работа над этимологическим словарем славянских языков // ВЯ. — 1967. — No. 4. — С. 34–35.
 Из славяно-иранских лексических отношений // Этимология. 1965: Материалы и исслед. по индоевр. и др. яз. — М., 1967. — С. 3-81.
 Рец.: Rudnyckyj J.B. An etymological dictionary of the Ukrainian language. Winnipeg, 1962. Pt. 1; 1963. Pt. 2; 1964. Pt. 3. 288 p. // Там же. — С. 382–383.
 Рец.: Schulz G.V. Studien zum Wortschatz der russischen Zimmerleute und Bautischler. Berlin — Wiesbaden, 1964. XVIII+229 S. (Slav. Vero ff.: Bd. 30) // Там же. — С. 388–389.
 Пер.: Фасмер М. Этимологический словарь русского языка: Пер. с нем. — М.: Прогресс, 1967. — Т. 2. — 671 с. (С доп.).
 Из материалов для этимологического словаря фамилий России: (Русские фамилии и фамилии, бытующие в России) // Этимология. 1966: Пробл. лингвогеографии и межъяз. контактов. — М., 1968. — С. 3-53.
 Этимологические исследования // Теоретические проблемы советского языкознания. — М., 1968. — С. 91–105. — Библиогр.: 50 назв.
 К сравнительно-этимологической характеристике союза а и сочетаний с ним в праславянском // Вопросы филологии: К 70-летию со дня рождения И. А. Василенко. — М., 1969. — С. 332–336.
 Заметки по этимологии и сравнительной грамматике // Этимология. 1968. — М., 1971. — С. 24–67.
 Из праславянского словообразования: именные сложения с приставкой а- // Проблемы истории и диалектологии славянских языков: Сб. ст. к 70-летию В. И. Борковского. — М., 1971. — С. 267–272.
 Пер.: Фасмер М. Этимологический словарь русского языка: Пер. с нем. — М.: Прогресс, 1971. — Т. 3. — 827 с. (С доп.).
 Заметки по этимологии и сравнительной грамматике // Этимология. 1970. — М., 1972. — С. 3-20.
 Литовское nasrai ‘пасть’: Этимология и грамматика (тезисы) // Baltistica I priedas, 1972. — C. 225–226.
 Фасмер Макс // Крат. лит. энцикл. — 1972. — Т. 7. — Стб. 902–903. — Библиогр.: 5 назв.
 Лексикография и этимология // Славянское языкознание: VII Междунар. съезд славистов, Варшава, авг. 1973: Докл. сов. делегации. — М.: Наука, 1973. — С. 294–313.
 Заметки по этимологии некоторых нарицательных и собственных имен // Этимология. 1971. — М.,1973. — С. 80–86.
 Пер.: Фасмер М. Этимологический словарь русского языка: Пер. с нем. — М.: Прогресс, 1973. -Т. 4. — 855 с. (С доп.).
 Еще раз мыслию по древу // Вопросы исторической лексикологии и лексикографии восточнославянских языков: К 80-летию С. Г. Бархударова. — М., 1974. — С. 22–27.
 Историческая и этимологическая лексикография. Праславянская лексика на б-начальное // Проблемы славянской исторической лексикологии и лексикографии: Тез. конф., Москва, окт. 1975 г. — Посвящается 50-летию Картотеки ДРС. — М., 1975. — Вып. 3. — С. 13–19.
 Заметки по балто-славянской этимологии: рус. стар., диал. овыдь ~лит. javide // Всесоюзная конференция по балтийскому языкознанию, 3-я, Вильнюс, 25-27 сент. 1975 г.: Тез. докл. — Вильнюс, 1975. — С. 150–155.
 Словообразование, семантика, этимология в новом «Этимологическом словаре славянских языков». 1-3 // Slawische Wortstudien: Samml.Bd. intern. Sympos. Fur etymol. Hist. Erforsch.slaw. Wortschatzes, Leipzig, 11–13. 10. 1972. — Bautzen, 1975. — S. 27–34.
 Этимология // Крат. лит. энцикл. — 1975. — Т. 8. — Стб. 984–986. — Библиогр.: 6 назв.
 Aus dem Material fu r ein etymologisches Wo rterbuch der Familiennamen des russischen Sprachgebietes // Sowjetische Namenforschung. — Berlin, 1975. — S. 167–195.
 Рец.: Unbegaun B.O. Russian surnames. Oxford, 1972. XVIII+529 р. // Этимология, 1973. — М., 1975. — С. 191–193.
 Этимологические исследования и лексическая семантика // Принципы и методы семантических исследований. — М., 1976. — С. 147–179. — Библиогр.: С. 178–179.
 [Выступление при открытии Конференции по проблемам славянской исторической лексикологии и лексикографии, 3-6 нояб. 1975 г.: Крат. излож.] // ВЯ. — 1976. — No. 3. — С. 147.
 Лексикография и этимология // Введение в языкознание. Хрестоматия / Сост. Б. Ю. Норман, Н. А. Павленко / Под ред. проф. А. Е. Супруна. — Минск, 1977. — С. 198–204.
 Этимологический словарь славянских языков и Праславянский словарь: (Опыт парал. чтения) // Этимология. 1976. — М., 1978. — С. 3–17.
 Серебро // Восточнославянское и общее языкознание. — М., 1978. — С. 95–102.
 Этимология // БСЭ. — 3-е изд. — 1978. — Т. 30. — С. 296. — Библиогр. : 4 назв.
 Этимологические исследования восточнославянских языков: Словари // ВЯ. — 1978. — No. 3. — С. 16–25.
 Из работы над русским Фасмером: К вопр. теории и практики перевода // ВЯ. — 1978. — No. 6. — С. 15–24.
 Этимологический словарь: // Русский язык: Энцикл. — М., 1979. — С. 405—407: ил.
 Этимология // Там же. — С. 407–408. — Библиогр.: 4 назв.
 Русь, Россия: (Вопр. топонимики) // Сов. Россия. — 1979. — 2 сент. — (Гипотезы, предположения).
 Этимология славянских языков // Вестн. АН СССР. — 1980. — No. 12. — С. 80–85.
 Реконструкция слов и их значений // ВЯ. — 1980. — No. 3. — С. 3–14.
 Этимологические исследования и лексическая семантика // Березин Ф. М. История советского языкознания: Некот. аспекты общ. теории языка. Хрестоматия [Учеб. пособие для студ. филол. спец. ун-тов]. — М., 1981. — С. 222–230.
 Этимология и история культуры // Наука и жизнь. — 1981. — No. 5. — С. 45–46.
 Из исследований по праславянскому словообразованию: генезис модели на * -i ninъ, *- janinъ // Этимология. 1980. — М., 1982.- С. 3–15.
 Этимологический словарь славянских языков: Праслав. лекс. фонд / Под ред. О. Н. Трубачева. — М.: Наука, 1984. — Вып. 11. — 220 с. — Совм. с др.
 Историческая и этимологическая лексикография // Теория и практика русской исторической лексикографии. — М., 1984. — С. 23–36.
 Регионализмы русской лексики на фоне учения о праславянском лексическом диалектизме // III Всесоюзная конференция по теоретическим вопросам языкознания «Типы языковых общностей и методы их изучения»: Тезисы. — М., 1984. — С. 147–149.
 Фасмер (Vasmer) Макс // Укр. сов. эцикл. — Киев, 1984.- Т. 11, кн. 1. — С. 458.
 Фасмер (Vasmer) Макс // Укр. рад. енцикл. — 2-е вид. — Киев, 1984. — Т. 11, кн. 1. — С. 535.
 Лексикография и этимология // Введение в языкознание. Хрестоматия / Сост. Б. Ю. Норман, Н. А. Павленко / Под ред. А. Е. Супруна. — Изд. 2-е. — Минск: «Высшая школа», 1984. — С. 207–212.
 О семантической теории в этимологическом словаре. Проблема омонимов подлинных и ложных и семантическая типология // Теория и практика этимологических исследований. — М., 1985. — С. 6–15.
 Gedanken zur russischen Ausgabe von Vasmers Russischem Etymologischem Wo rterbuch // Zf. slav. Philol. — 1986. — Bd. 46. — S. 372–383.
 Послесловие ко второму изданию «Этимологического словаря русского языка» М. Фасмера // Фасмер М. Этимологический словарь русского языка: В 4-х т.: Пер. с нем. — 2-е изд., стереотип. — М.: Прогресс, 1986. Т. 1. — С. 563–573.
 Пер. и доп.: Фасмер М. Этимологический словарь русского языка: В 4-х т.: Пер. с нем. — 2-е изд., стереотип. — М.: Прогресс, 1986. — Т. 1. — 573 с. (С доп.).
 Пер. и доп.: Фасмер М. Этимологический словарь русского языка: В 4-х т.: Пер. с нем. — 2-е изд., стереотип. — М.: Прогресс, 1986. — Т. 2. — 671 с. (С доп.).
 Ред.: Славянская историческая и этимологическая лексикография (1970—1980 гг.): Итоги и перспективы. Сб. обзоров / Чл. редкол. — М.: ИНИОН АН СССР, 1986. — 263 с.
 К истории одной семемы XVII в.: облегчить — ? уладить, устроить дело? : (Пол. zal atwic, др.-рус. облегчитися // История русского языка и лингвистическое источниковедение. — М., 1987. — С. 233–236.
 Дополнения и исправления к томам II, III, IV издания 2-го // Фасмер М. Этимологический словарь русского языка: В 4-х т.: Пер. с нем. — 2-е изд., стереотип. — М., 1987. — Т. 3. — С. 828–831.
 Дополнения и исправления к томам III, IV издания 2-го // Фасмер М. Этимологический словарь русского языка: В 4-х т.: Пер. с нем. — 2-е изд., стереотип. — М., 1987. — Т. 4. — С. 853–861.
 Русь, Россия // Рус. речь. — 1987. — No. 3. — С. 131—134: рис.
 Регионализмы русской лексики на фоне учения о праславянском лексическом диалектизме // Русская региональная лексика XI—XVII вв. — М., 1987. — С. 17–28. Библиогр.: 10 назв.
 Пер. и доп.: Фасмер М. Этимологический словарь русского языка: В 4-х т.: Пер. с нем. — 2-е изд., стереотип. — М.: Прогресс, 1987. — Т. 3. — 831 с.
 Пер. и доп. Фасмер М. Этимологический словарь русского языка: В 4-х т.: Пер. с нем. — 2-е изд., стереотип. — М.: Прогресс, 1987. — Т. 4. — 863 с.
 [О проблеме соотношения древнерусского и церковнославянского языков: Докл. в День слав. письменности и культуры, Новгород, 24-28 мая 1988 г.: Крат. излож.] // Сов. славяноведение. — 1988. — No. 6. — С. 119–120. — («Вначале было слово»).
 О языковом союзе и еще кое о чем // Дружба народов. — 1988. — No. 9. — С. 261–264.
 [О языковой ситуации в стране и путях совершенствования национально-языковых отношений: Ответы на вопросы] // Национально-языковые отношения в СССР: состояние и перспективы. — М., 1989. — С. 23–30.
 Русская культура и Русская энциклопедия // Наука и религия. — 1989. — No. 10. — С. 32–34.
 Тысячелетняя жизнь народа: Начал работу Общественный совет по подготовке «Русской энциклопедии» // Сов. Россия. — 1989. — 4 янв.
 Русская энциклопедия: [Беседа] // Лит. газ. — 1989. — 22 марта. — С. 5.
 В круге втором: Нерадостные размышления о подготовке «Русской энциклопедии» // Сов. Россия. — 1989. — 4 авг.
 Русская энциклопедия: Предварит. материалы (1988—1989 гг.): От ред. // Нар. образование. — 1990. — No. 1. — С. 153–154.
 Русь, Россия // Слово о русском языке: Кн. для чтения для студ.-филологов. Иностранцам о рус. яз. — М., 1991. — С. 217—220: ил.
 Этимологическая лексикография и история культуры // Русский язык и современность: Пробл. и перспективы развития русистики: Всесоюз. науч. конф., Москва, 20-23 мая 1991 г.: Докл. — М., 1991. — Ч. 1. — С. 264–277.
 Русская энциклопедия — начало пути: (Первые проб. материалы) // ЖВХО. — 1991. — Т. 36 — No. 4. — С. 501.
 Вначале было слово // За изобилие. — Дек. 1992. — No. 146. — С. 2.
 Русская энциклопедия // Домострой. — 1992. — No. 43. — С. 12–13.
 Славянская этимология вчера и сегодня // Научн. докл. высш. школы. Филол. науки. — 1993. — No. 2. — С. 3–18.
 Размышления о словарях и личности лексикографа // Историко-культурный аспект лексикографического описания русского языка. — М., 1995. — С. 113–122.
 О «рябчике», «куропатке» и других лингвистических свидетелях славянской прародины и праэкологии // ВЯ. — 1996. — No. 6. — С. 41–48.
 Рай // Рус. словесность. — 1996. — No. 3. — С. 7.
 К третьему изданию // Фасмер М. Этимологический словарь русского языка. В 4-х тт. Пер. с нем. — 3-е изд., стереотип. — СПб., 1996. — Т. I. — С. 4.
 Послесловие ко второму изданию «Этимологического словаря русского языка» М. Фасмера // Фасмер М. Этимологический словарь русского языка. В 4-х тт. Пер. с нем. — 3-е изд., стереотип. — СПб., 1996. — Т. I. — С. 563–573.
 Дополнения и исправления к томам II и III издания 2-го // Фасмер М. Этимологический словарь русского языка. В 4-х тт. Пер. с нем. — 3-е изд., стереотип. — СПб., 1996. — Т. III. — С. 828–831.
 Дополнения и исправления к томам III, IV издания 2-го // Фасмер М. Этимологический словарь русского языка. В 4-х тт. Пер. с нем. — 3-е изд., стереотип. — СПб., 1996. — Т. IV. — С. 853–861.
 Пер. и доп.: Фасмер М. Этимологический словарь русского языка. В 4-х тт. Пер. с нем. — 3-е изд., стереотип. — Спб.: Азбука — Терра, 1996. — Т. I — 576 с.; Т. II — 672 с.; Т. III — 832 с.; T. IV — 864 c.
 Русская энциклопедия и ее антиподы. Хатчинсоновская карманная энциклопедия // Рус. словесность. — 1997. — No. 3. — С. 12–16.
 Русская энциклопедия и ее антиподы. «Карманная энциклопедия the Hutchinson» // Деловая книга. — 1997.- No. 6 (54). — С. 13–14.
 Indoarica в Северном Причерноморье. - М.: Наука, 1999. - 320 с. .
 Человек словаря // Рязанские ведомости. — 24. 5. 2000. — Интервью с корр. Г. Гапуриной.
 Этногенез и культура древнейших славян: Лингвистические исследования / О. Н. Трубачев; [Отв.ред. Н. И. Толстой]. - Изд. 2-е, доп. М.: Наука, 2002. - 489 с. .

Biography
L. V. Shutko and L. A. Gindin, Oleg Nikolayevich Trubachyov (Moscow: Nauka, 1992). ; . 
Академик Олег Николаевич Трубачев: очерки, воспоминания, материалы / гл.ред. Е. П. Челышев, сост. Г. А. Богатова, А. К. Шапошников. - М.: Наука, 2009. - 627 с.: илл. - (Ученые России: очерки, воспоминания, материалы). - .

External links
https://web.archive.org/web/20110604202756/http://www.lib.utexas.edu/books/cross/members.pdf

1930 births
2002 deaths
People from Volgograd
Linguists from Russia
Corresponding Members of the USSR Academy of Sciences
Full Members of the Russian Academy of Sciences
Oles Honchar Dnipro National University alumni
Researchers of Slavic religion
Burials in Troyekurovskoye Cemetery
20th-century linguists